This is a list of Swedish television related events from 1974.

Events
6 April - Sweden wins the 19th Eurovision Song Contest in Brighton, United Kingdom. The winning song is "Waterloo", performed by ABBA. The year marks the first time the contest was won by a group.

Debuts

Television shows
1–24 December - Rulle på Rullseröd

1960s
Hylands hörna (1962-1983)

1970s
Hem till byn (1971-2006)

Ending this year

Births
24 February - David Hellenius, comedian & TV host
9 December - Peter Magnusson, comedian & actor

Deaths

See also
1974 in Sweden

References